The 1996 Gael Linn Cup, the most important representative competition for elite level participants in the women's team field sport of camogie, was won by Munster, who defeated Ulster in the final, played at Russell Park.

Arrangements
Matches were played off over the weekend of 16 June at Russell Park. Maureen McAleenan scored 2–7 for Ulster and Denise Gilligan 2–6 for Connacht as Ulster beat Connacht 4–8 to 4–7 in the semi-final. Leinster suffered their worst-ever Gael-Linn Cup defeat, losing 3–16 to 0–to Munster.

The Final
The final was a ten-goal thriller, and the only time in a major camogie competition when the losing team scored six goals. Ulster led Munster by eight points at half-time, Munster's second half come-back brought the match to extra time and Munster's fitness told as they won 4–18 to 6–10. Fiona O'Driscoll scored 2–10 for Munster and Maureen McAleenan 3–4 for Ulster.

Gael Linn Trophy
Ulster defeated Connacht, 3–12 to 1–3, Munster defeated Leinster by 4–13 to 2–7 and Munster completed the double with a 3–17 to 1–7 victory over Ulster.

Final stages

|}

Junior Final

|}

References

External links
 Camogie Association

1996 in camogie
1996
Cam